The North of Scotland Hydro-Electric Board (1943–1990) was founded to design, construct and manage hydroelectricity projects in the Highlands of Scotland. It is regarded as one of the major achievements of Scottish politician Thomas Johnston, who chaired the board from 1945 to 1959.

Background 
In the 1930s several schemes were proposed to develop hydro-electric power in the north of Scotland. These met with opposition by landowners, sporting interest and the coal mining industry on the grounds of competition. There was also opposition from official sources. Plans to build a power station at Kinlochleven for the benefit of the aluminium industry were shelved when Inverness County Council refused to allow water from the River Spey and River Laggan to cross the county border into Argyllshire. In 1938, the Caledonian Water Power bill was defeated in Parliament. This would have allowed a private company to build hydro-electric schemes in the Highlands, and its defeat was welcomed by the Inverness Courier, whose editorial proclaimed:
The opponents of [the Bill] have been falsely represented as being opposed to the development of water power and the introduction of industy in every shape and form. Nothing could be further from the truth. What we ... maintain is that there shall be no further development of the water power resources of the Highlands until a Committee is set up by the Government to enquire into [how] ... these water resources should be developed for the benefit of the Highlands.

When World War II broke out, Tom Johnston, who had been a member of Parliament since the 1920s, was appointed as Regional Commissioner for Civil Defence for Scotland. In 1941, Winston Churchill, who was by then Prime Minister, having failed to convince Johnston to accept a post in London, asked him to be Secretary of State for Scotland. He agreed, providing that he could form a Council of State consisting of all five of the former Secretaries of State who were still alive. If they could agree on an issue affecting Scotland, Johnston would look to Churchill to support the plan. He also did not want to receive any payment for the post, while the war lasted. Like the Inverness Courier, Johnston did not want private enterprise to be managing national resources, and had voted against the Caledonian Water Power bill in 1938. When another bill for a hydro-electric scheme in Glen Affric was put forward in September 1941, it was defeated, and Johnston announced that the government had its own plans for water power in the Highlands. In October, the Committee on Hydro-Electric Development in Scotland was set up, although it was generally known as the Cooper Committee, after its chairman Lord Cooper. Other members of the committee were William Douglas Weir, an engineer who had helped to plan Britain's National power grid in the 1920s; Neil Beaton, chairman of the Scottish Co-operative Wholesale Society; James Williamson, a civil engineer who had been involved with hydro-electric schemes in Galloway in the 1930s; and John A Cameron of the Scottish Land Court.

Prior to the committee meeting, Cooper was sceptical of its aims, believing that most of the feasible hydro-electric schemes in Scotland had been explored by the Snell Committee, which met between 1918 and 1921. With the exception of the Glen Affric scheme and the West Highland scheme, both of which had failed to gain Parliamentary approval, the only schemes left to pursue were small and unlikely to be viable. He initially dismissed the subsequent Hilleary Report as amateurish, but careful study of it convinced him that some action could be taken. Despite the wartime conditions, the committee devoted the first half of 1942 to researching existing documentation and consulting with a wide range of organisations, including the Central Electricity Board, the Electricity Commission, fishery boards, local authorities, estate owners and even the Royal Scottish Automobile Club. The committee published their report on 15 December 1942, and it was quite remarkable, not least for its clarity and lack of ambiguity. It was systematic, analytical and realistic, causing Johnson to tell the House of Commons that it was 'by common consent, a masterly production and a model of terse, constructive and courageous draftsmanship.' It argued that state policy had for over twenty years discouraged or prohibited private enterprise from developing the water resources of the Highlands, and had failed to produce its own strategy, resulting in deepening depression gripping the region. It suggested that the only realistic solution was a new public body called the North of Scotland Hydro-electric Board to initiate and develop schemes, including the distribution of power in areas where there was no existing supply network.

Johnson worked hard to ensure that the report would be well received. He talked to many people across the political spectrum, attempting to disarm potential opponents. Civil servants working for the Scottish Office also worked to understand potential opposition to the scheme, noting that the most likely group to oppose it would be the Coal Owners Association, who had a powerful influence in Parliament. By the time it was put before Parliament, Johnson had obtained cross party support from eight Cabinet Ministers, including the Chancellor of the Exchequer, Sir Kingsley Wood. At its second reading in the House of Commons, Johnson stated that the bill was a 'partial remedy' for the malaise of the Highlands, which was 'rapidly bleeding to death' as a result of outward migration. He emphasised that surplus power would be sold to the national grid, to defray the costs of distribution in remote rural areas, and that the new Board would be responsible for economic development and social improvement of large swathes of the Highlands. Despite the clear vision of the original report, large numbers of checks were added to the bill, requiring Parliamentary approval at every stage of implementation, to the extent that James Henderson-Stewart of East Fife, who represented the Liberal National Party, moved an amendment to attempt to free the Board from such bureaucratic interference, arguing that if Parliament was not going to trust the Board to do its job, then they should not set it up in the first place. His amendment was later withdrawn when the Lord Advocate agreed to amend the bill at its committee stage, based on the objections raised during the debate.

The bill was received enthusiastically in the House of Lords, where it was presented by Lord Alness. There was widespread support for the measures, and particular praise for Tom Johnson. Lord Airlie stated that speed was important, as residents were unlikely to remain content with the economic depression of the region for long. Finally, Lord Lovat appealed that when projects were implemented, they should use Scottish workers from the Highland Division when they returned from war, rather than Irish navvies. The necessary legal powers were granted by the Hydro-electric Development (Scotland) Act 1943, which was passed on 5 August 1943.

Constitution 
In September 1943, the names of the five board members were announced. Four were jointly appointed by the Secretary of State for Scotland and the Minister of Fuel and Power. The fifth was a nominee of the Central Electricity Board, and a member of that board. The chairman was to be David Ogilvy, the Earl of Airlie. He had worked with Johnson when they had been in charge of civil defence, and had initially been critical of the 1943 Act because its scope was too limited. The deputy chairman and chief executive was Edward MacColl, an engineer with wide experience of hydro-electric projects and electrical distribution networks. His was the only full-time post. Neil Beaton had previously been a member of the Cooper Committee, Hugh Mackenzie was the Provost of Inverness, and the final member was the Central Electricity Board nominee, Walter Whigham, who was also a director of the Bank of England. Ill health led to him being replaced by the engineer Sir Duncan Watson soon afterwards.

Shortly after the conception of the board, Major Gwilym Lloyd George, the Minister for Fuel and Power, led a committee which considered how electricity supply could be rationalised in Britain. Johnson argued that his proposals would destroy the principles of the 1943 Act, and eventually ensured that the Hydro-Electric Board was excluded from them. Some initial work under the Act was carried out by civil servants, but the Board took office in January 1944, and moved into a permanent office in Rothesay Terrace, Edinburgh a few weeks later. MacColl knew how to build up new organisations, and assembled a group of enthusiastic engineers around him, all of whom were relatively young. It was a fairly small team, and they were always over-worked. MacColl then invited five engineers, drawn from major engineering consultancies, to consider how the aims of the Act could be implemented. This constituted the Panel of Technical Advisers, and they became an important and permanent part of the Board's activities for fifteen years.

The headquarters of the board in Rothesay Terrace, Edinburgh were located outside the board's operating area. The 1943 Act specified the management board was to comprise a chairman and not less than four and not more than eight members. The Board in 1958 comprised: Thomas Johnston (Chairman), Sir Hugh Mackenzie (Deputy Chairman), Sir John Erskine, Sir George McGlashan, A.I. Mackenzie, A. Macrae, I.A. Duncan Millar, William Hughes, John Jardine.

When the  UK electricity supply industry was nationalised in 1948, the board took over the assets of the Grampian Electricity Supply Company and other bodies producing electricity in the northern part of Scotland, these were:  Campbeltown and Mid-Argyll, Crieff, Dunoon and District, Loch Leven, North of Scotland, Peterhead, Stornoway, Thurso and District, Dundee, Aberdeen, Perth, Inverness, Buckie, Lossiemouth, Branderburgh and Oban Corporations.

Activity
One of the first responsibilities was to produce a Development Scheme. This would detail the available water resources in their area of operation, which had the potential to later become 'constructional schemes'. MacColl pressed on at breakneck speed, and within three months they had a list of 102 sites with potential for development. These ranged in size from small, such as one utilising Loch nan Gillean (Plockton) and streams, with a capacity of four million units (kilowatt-hours per year) to huge schemes such as that at Glen Affric, with a capacity of 440 million units. The capacity of all the schemes combined was estimated to be 6,274 million units, which was considerably more than the 4,000 million units suggested by the Cooper Committee. MacColl wanted to ensure that no scheme could later be rejected because it had not been included in the Development Scheme. Guthrie Brown, one of the Panel of Technical Advisers, later wrote of his amazement at MacColl's detailed knowledge of so vast an area and its potential for water power.

While Johnston was still fighting the political battle to save the Board from Lloyd George's reorganisations, MacColl wanted to begin building a scheme to demonstrate the effectiveness of the Board. He chose Loch Sloy as the first constructional scheme. The loch had been the proposed site of a 360 MegaWatt pumped storage scheme in 1935, which had been rejected by Parliament, and the new scheme was for a conventional hydro-electric station with a lower capacity of 130 MW. The plans included two smaller projects, at Loch Morar and Kyle of Lochalsh, which were probably included to demonstrate the Board's commitment to providing power to remote communities, even though on their own these two projects would not have been economically viable. Despite approval by the Amenity Committee, the Fishery Committee and the Electricity Commissioners, the Loch Sloy scheme was opposed by several county councils and some private individuals, raising the same issues that had prevented development of hydro-electric power in the Highlands for many years. An inquiry, chaired by John Cameron KC, was held in Edinburgh, which lasted for six days. The Board had done themselves no favours by moving the site of the dam after the original plans were published, but Cameron was sympathetic to their cause, and handled attempts to scuttle the plans skillfully. Some of the county councils withdrew their opposition during the hearing, but Dumbarton Council persisted with their claim that they needed Loch Sloy for domestic water supply. Cameron decided that their development plans were too optimistic to be achievable, and ruled that the scheme was in the public interest. He stated that the Secretary of State should approve the scheme, and Tom Johnston as Secretary of State did so. No further objections were received while it was before Parliament, and the Loch Sloy scheme was authorised on 28 March 1945.

The second constructional scheme was the Tummel–Garry scheme, which included a much smaller project for a power station at Gairloch. The main scheme would involve the construction of three dams, the first near Trinafour to create Loch Errochty along the course of a stream called Errochty Water, a tributary of the River Garry. This would feed a power station near the head of Loch Tummel. The second dam would be built across the River Tummel upsteam of the Falls of Tummel, and would feed Clunie power station, located below the falls. The level of Loch Tummel would be  higher. The third dam was to be built across the Tummel above Pitlochry, which would supply compensation water to maintain the flow in the river downstream as well as generating power. The Hydro-Electric Board were unsure whether to proceed at the time, because of the opposition to their previous scheme, but MacColl was adamant that they should fight to ensure the principles of the original Act of Parliament were not eroded. The Central Electricity Board and the Electricity Commissioners approved the scheme on 7 February 1945, but the Amenity Committee and the Fisheries Committee both wanted parts of it omitted. When it was published by the Secretary of State, there were 25 formal objections, with Perthshire County Council, riparian owners and the residents of Pitlochry leading the opposition.

Johnston decided that a tribunal was necessary to consider the objections, and John Cameron was joined by Sir Robert Bryce Walker and Major G H M Brown Lindsay. It began on 25 May 1945 and lasted for ten days, with the transcript of the proceedings running to 1,188 pages. MacColl was unable to speak, as he was ill, and Lord Airlie was savaged by those opposing the scheme. In desperation, he asked the question, "Do the people of this country want electricity or do they not?" Lord Airlie recovered his composure for the second day of the hearing, and was followed by technical experts, including Thomas Lawrie, who spoke in place of MacColl, and J Guthrie Brown, who spoke eloquently on every aspect of the civil engineering works. The objectors had their say from the end of day six onwards, and predicted that the amenities of the area would be destroyed by the scheme. It also became clear on day nine that a number of riparian owners had donated waterfalls to the National Trust for Scotland, to make the Board's job more difficult. The final report acknowledged the serious objections to the scheme, and examined them against the public interest. It stated that the scheme must stand or fall as a whole, and that despite some possible damage to amenities, the project should proceed.

Following the decision of the tribunal, an order to confirm the scheme was placed before Parliament, but unlike previous schemes, there were attempts to annul the order. William Snadden, the member for Perth and Kinross lead the attack, claiming that "the beauty of the heart of Scotland will be forever broken." All of the issues that had been aired at the tribunal were raised again, and there were savage attacks on both the Board and on Lord Airlie. There were however supporters for the scheme, and Colonel Errol, the member for Althincham and Sale, was particularly lucid as he proclaimed that the Scottish Lowlands and England were going to pay for cheap power for the Highlands. He also wondered whether those who would no longer visit the River Tummel might be outnumbered by those who came to see the engineering works, and he reminded the house that everyone connected with the scheme was Scottish. When a vote was taken, annulment of the order was rejected by 248 votes to 63. Lord Kinnaird was persuaded not to introduce a similar motion to annul the order in the House of Lords, and so the Tummel–Garry scheme was authorised on 19 November 1945. However, Lord Kinnaird introduced a debate on the operation of the Hydro-Electric Development Act, at which Lord Airlie was able to put the case for the Tummel–Garry scheme and to explain the way in which the board operated. There were some who felt that there was no need for hydro-electric power at all, because it would soon be superseded by atomic power. In summary, Lord Westwood, the leader of the house, spoke in favour of the Board and Lord Kinnaird's motion was rejected, allowing the Board to continue. Lord Westwood also stated during the debate that all objections to the Fannich scheme, on the River Conon in Ross-shire, had been withdrawn, and the scheme would therefore proceed.

Power generation
The board's generating capacity was mainly provided by the construction of "schemes" of linked hydro-electric stations, with multiple generators located across one or more catchment area. There were also steam driven and diesel engine driven power stations. When the board was first constituted it owned only two power stations: the oil-fired Kirkwall and Rothesay stations.

Hydro-electric power stations 
The following hydro-electric stations were operational prior to nationalisation. Some were transferred to the South of Scotland Board.

The principal schemes constructed by the board were:

 Affric-Beauly
 Breadalbane
 Conon
 Foyers
 Great Glen or Garry–Moriston
 Shin
 Sloy-Awe
 Tummel Valley
In 1958 the following hydro-electric stations were in operation:

Hydro-electric power stations under construction in 1958 were:

The following additional hydro-electric stations were commissioned in the 1960s.

By 1968 the installed capacity of all conventional hydro-electric power stations operated by North of Scotland Board was 1047.06 MW, and the total average annual output was 2911.4 GWh.

Cruachan pumped storage scheme 
See main article: Cruachan Power Station

The Cruachan power station (also known as the Cruachan Dam) is a pumped-storage hydroelectric power station commissioned in 1965. It can provide 440 MW of power and has a capacity of 7.1 GWh.

Steam power stations 
There were two steam power stations in 1958.

Diesel engine stations 
There were nine diesel fuelled power stations in 1958.

Transmission 
The supply of electricity was through the Highland Grid operating at 132 kV. In 1958 this comprised 1,630 circuit miles with 31 substations. The total length of all mains was 17,369 circuit miles.

Distribution area 
Supply to customers was through 13 distribution areas. The areas' supply capacity and key data for 1956 were as follows:

Operating data 1949 to 1989 
Key operating data for the North of Scotland Hydro-Electric Board is summarised in the table.

The amount of electricity supplied by the board, in GWh, is shown on the graph.

Dissolution 
North of Scotland Electricity plc was formed in 1989 to acquire the board's assets ahead of privatisation, however the name was later changed to Scottish Hydro-Electric plc.  The board was dissolved in March 1990 and privatised in June 1991.  The company's head office was moved from Edinburgh to Perth.

A further name change to Scottish and Southern Energy plc was made in December 1998 after the merger with Southern Electric plc. The brand name "Scottish Hydro-Electric" continues to be used for the company's Scottish business.

See also
Energy policy of the United Kingdom
Energy use and conservation in the United Kingdom
South of Scotland Electricity Board

References

Bibliography

Defunct companies of Scotland
Former nationalised industries of the United Kingdom
Energy in Scotland
Electric power in Scotland
Renewable energy in Scotland
1943 establishments in Scotland
1990 disestablishments in Scotland
Hydroelectric power companies of the United Kingdom
British companies disestablished in 1990
1942 establishments in England
British companies established in 1943
Energy companies established in 1943
Electric power companies of Scotland